The 2013 Firestone 550 was twenty-third running of the Firestone 550 and the eighth round of the 2013 IndyCar Series season. It took place on Saturday, June 8. The race was contested over 228 laps at the  Texas Motor Speedway in Fort Worth, Texas, and was televised by ABC in the United States.

Report

Background
Before coming to Texas Motor Speedway, IndyCar completed the first doubleheader of the season at Belle Isle in the Chevrolet Indy Dual in Detroit, where Mike Conway earned his first victory of the season in the first race, while Simon Pagenaud won his first IndyCar series race in the second part of the doubleheader.  Entering the Firestone 550, both Marco Andretti and Hélio Castroneves were tied atop the IndyCar drivers point championship, each with 206 point, though both did not have any victories on the season.  Justin Wilson entered the race as the defending champion having won the previous year's race.

Report

Classification

Starting grid

Sources:

Race results

Notes
 Points include 1 point for leading at least 1 lap during a race, an additional 2 points for leading the most race laps, and 1 point for Pole Position.

Standings after the race

References

External links

Firestone 550
Firestone 600
Firestone 550
Firestone 550